Wilfredo Vázquez Olivera (born August 2, 1960) is a Puerto Rican former professional boxer who competed from 1981 to 2002. He held world championships in three weight classes, including the WBA bantamweight title from 1987 to 1988, the WBA super bantamweight title from 1992 to 1995, and the WBA and lineal featherweight titles from 1996 to 1998. His son, Wilfredo Vázquez Jr., is also a former boxer and world champion.

Early life and amateur career
Vázquez was born in Río Piedras, one of the largest districts of San Juan, but he was raised in Bayamón. Unlike most Puerto Rican boxers, he began practicing the basics of boxing when he was 18 years old. Vázquez began training on November 1978, two weeks after the death of his father, Juan Vázquez. His decision was directly influenced by his father's desire of having a son that practiced boxing. Juan Vázquez was a follower of Wilfredo Gómez and died shortly after purchasing tickets for Gomez's fight against Carlos Zarate. This affected Vázquez, who decided to mimic Gómez and win a professional world championship, drawing motivation from his accomplishments. He began training at Ruiz Soler gym, where he met several boxers that he regarded as "world class" material, but all of them failed to reach success after following other paths. As an amateur, Vázquez fought 17 times, losing three contests. He didn't pursue a spot in Puerto Rico's national boxing team, considering that at his age it would be hard to earn a spot, while being expecting to earn money quickly as a professional. Vázquez married Alice Lozada, with whom he has three sons, Wilfredo, Jr., Noel and Israel.

Professional career
Vázquez debuted as a professional on January 29, 1981, training under the guidance of Manny Siaca. In this contest, he lost to William Ramos by unanimous decision in a four-round fight. After this fight, he won his first victory in his second fight, defeating Felix Cortez by knockout in two rounds. This was followed by a second knockout against Roberto Mercedes, who debuted against Vázquez. On April 30, 1981, he scored the first draw of his career, in a six-round fight against Eusebio Espinal. Vázquez's first contest outside of Puerto Rico was against Reinaldo Roque, whom he defeated by knockout in Miami, Florida. In his next match, he won the first decision of his career scoring a points victory over Herminio Adorno. Vázquez was scheduled to participate in Don King's Carnival of Champions card, where Gómez and Wilfred Benítez competed, but an injury suffered during training left him out of the event. In the last fight of this year, he defeated Pedro Alindato by knockout. On March 3, 1982, Vázquez beat Orlando Perez by points. He would fight eight more times during this year, all of them in New York City or Las Vegas. In these fights, Vázquez defeated Ion Trian, Jose Luis Martinez, Sonny Long and Rudy Perez twice. In 1983, he fought five times, winning every contest by knockout. His opponents during this time frame were: Euginio Paulino, Andres Torres, Robert Mullins, Ramón Cruz and Pedro Rodriguez. On March 17, 1984, Vázquez defeated Juan "Chiqui" Torres by knockout in the fourth round to win the vacant Puerto Rican bantamweight title. In his next fight, Vázquez received the first no contest of his career against Julio Guerrero. He closed the year defeating Javier Barajas and Norgie Castro. In 1985, Vázquez had a slow year, only fighting twice. His only contests were against Jeff Whaley and Osvaldo Acevedo, both of whom he defeated by technical knockout.

First title shot
On February 8, 1986, Vázquez received his first opportunity for a world championship against Miguel "Happy" Lora, who held the World Boxing Council's bantamweight championship. Vázquez received a knockdown the second round, before scoring one in the fourth round. After twelve rounds, the judges awarded Lora a unanimous decision. His next fight was against José "Pambelito" Cervantes, who had fought for the WBC's super bantamweight championship five years earlier. Vázquez won this contest by knockout in the third round. After losing to Antonio Avelar by eighth round knockout, he concluded the year defeating Jesus Muñiz. On March 14, 1987, Vázquez defeated Juan Carazo by technical knockout in the first round. Less than a month later, he defeated Lee Cargle in five rounds.

WBA bantamweight champion
On October 4, 1987, Vázquez earned a second titular opportunity, receiving a fight against Chan-yong Park in South Korea. He won the fight by knockout in the tenth round to become the World Boxing Association's champion. 
Vázquez's first defense was versus Takuya Muguruma in a card organized in Osaka. The fight was declared a draw, although two of the judges scored it 116-114 and 117-112 in favor of Vázquez, while the third considered it a 115-115 tie. Subsequently, he defended against Kaokor Galaxy in Thailand, losing by split decision. The scores were 112-115 and 113-115 in favor of Galaxy and 114-113 in favor of Vázquez. Three months later, he returned to action against Raúl Pérez, but lost by unanimous decision in 10 rounds. Following this defeat, Vázquez signed a contract with Felix "Tutico" Zabala who managed to secure a regional title fight against Fernie Morales. The contest was for the International Boxing Federation's Inter-Continental bantamweight championship, in twelve rounds, Vázquez earned a points victory. This was followed by a knockout victory in preparatory fight against Patrick Kamy, which was part of a card organized in Spain. On June 19, 1990, Vázquez fought against Israel Contreras, who won by knockout, earning what was regarded as an unexpected victory. After recovering from this loss, he  defeated Joe Orewa to win the International Boxing Council's super bantamweight title on September 10, 1990. Vázquez closed the year with a technical knockout victory over Atenor Solar. On April 8, 1991, he defeated Paquito Openo by knockout in seven rounds.

WBA super bantamweight champion
This win earned Vázquez an opportunity for the WBA's super bantamweight championship. The fight was a rematch against Raúl Pérez and it took place on March 27, 1992. After scoring a knockdown in the second round, Vázquez defeated Pérez by technical knockout in the third, when the fight was interrupted seconds after a second knockdown. After defeating Juan Batista Bisono in a preparatory fight, Vázquez began a series of successful defenses. The first of these was a majority decision over Freddy Cruz in Italy. This was followed by victories over Thierry Jacob, Luis Enrique Mendoza, Thierry Jacob, a controversial points win against Juan Polo Perez in France, Hiroaki Yokota and Yūichi Kasai in Japan and Jae-Won Choi and Orlando Canizales in the United States. Due to his tendency of competing in title fights outside of Puerto Rico, Vázquez became known as El Viajero, Spanish for "the traveler". His fight against Canizales was recognized by Home Box Office as the best in the division. On May 13, 1995, he competed in his first defense in Bayamón, losing the fight against Antonio Cermeño by points. In his first fight since this loss, Vázquez scored a solid victory over Pablo "Mulato" Valenzuela. After this fight, he returned to action in Ponce, defeating Carlos Rocha by knockout in the first round. His last fight of the year was against Jose Luis Velazquez whom he defeated by technical knockout to win the vacant WBA Fedelatin featherweight championship.

WBA and lineal featherweight champion
On May 18, 1996, Vázquez fought Eloy Rojas for the lineal & WBA featherweight championships in Las Vegas. Rojas held the championships and entered the fight with a record of 33-1, which made him a favorite to retain the titles. Until the eleventh round, Rojas had a lead in all of the judges' scorecards, with scores of 98-92, 92-100 and 94-96. During the break between rounds, his corner told Vázquez that he was losing, surprising him since he considered that the fight was close to the point of being tied. Realizing this fact, he pressured the offensive, scoring two knockdowns which prompted the referee to stop the fight as a technical knockout. On December 7, 1996, Vázquez made his first defense of the titles against Bernardo Mendoza. He dominated the first four rounds by boxing, limiting his offense while Mendoza presented a timid offensive. During the final minute of the fifth round, Vázquez noticed an opening in Mendoza's defense and landed a combination that scored a knockdown. Mendoza was able to stand before the conclusion of the protection count, but his corner submitted following a second knockdown. On August 23, 1997, Vázquez defended against Roque Cassiani. Throughout the fight, Cassini moved his head from side to side, which resulted in multiple head butts. Due to this, Vázquez pursued the offensive but retained a cautious approach. In the tenth round, he slipped and fell to the floor as Cassini threw a punch, which was scored as a knockdown. Vázquez was eventually declared the winner by unanimous decision, with scores 118-110, 116-112 and 116-110. On November 8, 1997, he defeated Genaro Ríos to retain for the third time. In March 1998, the WBA stripped the championship from Vázquez, citing that he failed to meet the organisation's regulation by not signing a contract against their first contender, Antonio Cermeño, within the established time. He openly expressed anger over the issue, citing that a contract was solicited but not signed due to managerial differences with Don King.

Vázquez vs. Hamed

This was followed by a contest against the World Boxing Organization's champion, Naseem Hamed. The fight took place on April 18, 1998, being held in Manchester. Hamed used his speed to control the offensive, scoring four knockdowns. In the seventh round, the referee stopped the contest following a second consecutive knockdown. Vázquez's best round was the fifth, where he outscored Hamed, landing 26 punches against 4. Vázquez would lose his lineal championship to Hamed. This was the most lucrative fight of his career, when he received $600,000 as payment. This fight caused tension within his family, who were being informed by telephone of the results. From this point onwards, Vázquez began fighting sporadically.

Later career
In 2000, he returned after a year on inactivity, defeating Antonio Oscar Salas and Russell Mosley before losing to Juan Lazcano in a contest for the vacant NABF lightweight championship. On December 13, 200, he announced his retirement, but returned to action on February 22, 2002, defeating José Alfonso Rodríguez. Vázquez closed his career that year after defeating Julio César Cardona and Eddie Saenz twice, including his last fight that was held in Bayamón.

Retirement and legacy
Following his first retirement, Vázquez followed a practice done also by other pugilists, such as Juan Laporte, Félix Trinidad, Julio César Chávez, Bobby Czyz, Sean O'Grady, Sugar Ray Leonard, Santos Laciar, Lennox Lewis, Roy Jones Jr. and Héctor Camacho among others, deciding to become a boxing commentator. Since he was sure that this retirement was definitive, the pugilist joined Univision and began narrating fights along the network's other sportscasters. Following his second retirement, Vázquez began working as a boxing trainer. Under this office, he has most notably trained his two sons, Wilfredo and Israel. Vázquez, Jr. debuted as a professional on December 8, 2006, being managed by Rubén Zavala and his promotion All Star Boxing. Vázquez has expressed that he didn't want his son to become a boxer, expecting him to study and develop a profession within the fields of law, but he accepted to train him after noticing real interest, despite knowing that he lacked any amateur experience. Subsequently, he noted his interest to be one half of the first father and son duo to win world championships in Puerto Rico. On September 12, 2008, Vázquez, Jr. won his first professional championship, the WBO Latino super bantamweight title, before incorporating the WBA Fedecentro super bantamweight title to his résumé two months later. On February 27, 2010, Vázquez, Jr. won the WBO's super bantamweight world championship joining his father as the third father-and-son combination to win world championships. They also became the first to do so in the same division. Israel Vázquez debuted on his brother's second defense, competing in the light flyweight division.

Outside of the championships won as an active boxer, Vázquez also received other recognitions due to his work. In 1996, he received the Frank Parilla Award from the Puerto Rico Boxing Commission, which is awarded to the boxer that is universally regarded as the best Puerto Rican Boxer of the year. He won this recognition after he made history by becoming the first boxer to win three separate titles within the same organisation, in this case the World Boxing Association. That same year, the WBA gave him the award for "Best Latin American Boxer of the Year". Vázquez subsequently commented that he expected to win the "Boxer of the Year" award that was won by Evander Holyfield, but he accepted the selection under the circumstances. He is the only Puerto Rican boxer to be honored by having a long-distance foot race named after him, with the "Maratón Wilfredo Vázquez" being held annually in Bayamón since 1988.

Prior to many of his fights, Vázquez spent months training for them at Toluca, Mexico, a city that was also favored by such other boxing luminaries as Chávez and Salvador Sánchez for such practice

Professional boxing record

See also
Notable boxing families
List of Puerto Rican boxing world champions
List of world bantamweight boxing champions
List of world super-bantamweight boxing champions
List of world featherweight boxing champions
List of boxing triple champions

References

Further reading

External links

1960 births
Living people
Puerto Rican male boxers
Sportspeople from Bayamón, Puerto Rico
Puerto Rican expatriates in Mexico
World bantamweight boxing champions
World super-bantamweight boxing champions
Vazquez, Wilfredo
World Boxing Association champions